This is a list of airports in Russia (Russian Federation), sorted by location. , Russia had 227 operational airports registered by the Federal Air Transport Agency.

List

Military airfields

See also 
Transport in Russia
List of the busiest airports in Russia
List of airports by ICAO code: U#U – Russia (Russian Federation)
Wikipedia: WikiProject Aviation/Airline destination lists: Europe#Russian Federation

References

External links
  Airports and Aerodromes at Rosaviatsiya
  Association of CIS Airports
  Airports and Airlines of CIS
Lists of airport in Russia:
Great Circle Mapper
FallingRain.com
Aircraft Charter World
The Airport Guide
World Aero Data
A-Z World Airports

Russia